Sugden is a town in Jefferson County, Oklahoma, United States. The population was 43 at the 2010 census.

Geography
Sugden is located in southwestern Jefferson County at  (34.081288, -97.978665).

Sugden sits on the west side of the valley of Beaver Creek, a south-flowing tributary of the Red River.

Demographics

As of the census of 2000, there were 59 people, 20 households, and 18 families residing in the town. There were 23 housing units at an average density of 106.4 per square mile (40.4/km2). The racial makeup of the town was 88.14% White, 6.78% Native American, 5.08% from other races. Hispanic or Latino of any race were 10.17% of the population.

There were 20 households, out of which 50.0% had children under the age of 18 living with them, 80.0% were married couples living together, 10.0% had a female householder with no husband present, and 10.0% were non-families. 10.0% of all households were made up of individuals, and 10.0% had someone living alone who was 65 years of age or older. The average household size was 2.95 and the average family size was 3.17.

In the town, the population was spread out, with 28.8% under the age of 18, 10.2% from 18 to 24, 28.8% from 25 to 44, 15.3% from 45 to 64, and 16.9% who were 65 years of age or older. The median age was 32 years. For every 100 females, there were 126.9 males. For every 100 females age 18 and over, there were 121.1 males.

The median income for a household in the town was $20,000, and the median income for a family was $21,250. Males had a median income of $16,667 versus $26,250 for females. The per capita income for the town was $8,676. There were 18.8% of families and 16.9% of the population living below the poverty line, including 21.1% of under eighteens and none of those over 64.

References

Towns in Jefferson County, Oklahoma
Towns in Oklahoma